Rhodopina perakensis is a species of beetle in the family Cerambycidae. It was described by Stephan von Breuning in 1970.

References

perakensis
Beetles described in 1970